Second Lake may refer to:
Second Lake (New York), part of the Fulton Chain of Lakes
Second Lake (Bisby Lakes, New York)
Second Lake, Nova Scotia
Second Lake, second of four lakes in the Nanaimo Lakes chain